The maple-basswood leafroller (Sparganothis pettitana) is a moth of the family Tortricidae. It is found in eastern North America, from Nova Scotia to Florida, west to Texas.

The wingspan is about 20 mm. Adults are on wing from May to July. There is one generation per year.

The larvae feed on the leaves of apple, basswood and maple. They hide and feed inside a rolled leaf or leaf-tip. Pupation occurs inside the leaf rolls.

References

External links
 Bug Guide

Sparganothis
Moths of North America
Moths described in 1869